Pembroke Management Ltd. is a privately held Canadian investment management firm that manages investment portfolios and separately managed accounts for Canadian pension funds, foundations, endowments, wealthy families and individuals, in addition to the GBC family of mutual funds.

Since Pembroke's founding in 1968, the portfolio management team has applied fundamental analysis and conducted ongoing executive level interviews in order to identify high quality companies with compelling growth prospects, unrecognized intrinsic value, and strong entrepreneurial leadership.

Pembroke has offices in Montreal and Toronto.

History
1929 - The Great Britain and Canada Investment Corporation, now known as the GBC American Growth Fund Inc., was incorporated in March. $11,000,000 was raised through the efforts of Nesbitt Thomson, Govett Sons & Co. and Iselin & Co. Pembroke has managed the assets since 1968
1968 - Pembroke Management Ltd. was founded in September by Neil B. Ivory, Clifford L. Larock, A. Scott Taylor and Ian A. Soutar to manage some funds previously managed by Arbuckle Govett. The firm's name is a reference to Pembroke College, Cambridge.
1970 - The Pembroke Fund Ltd. was launched.
1988 - GBC North America converted from a closed end fund to a mutual fund. Ivory & Sime Pembroke was formed by Pembroke Management and Ivory & Sime PLC. To market the GBC family of mutual funds in Canada and the UK. The funds were launched on November 1.
2020 - All GBC Mutual Fund and Pooled Funds were renamed under the Pembroke banner.

See also
Pembroke Private Wealth Management

References

External links

Rob Carrick “A mutual fund family worth knowing about” The Globe and Mail September 28, 2010
James Langton "Money management as pure art" December 31, 1999
Simon Avery "Fixated on the Fed" The Globe and Mail October 10, 2010

Investment companies of Canada